Ganzee (also Gansee) is a former village in the Brokopondo District of Suriname. The village was home to Maroons of the Saramaka tribe, and located on the Suriname River. In 1965, the village was flooded after the construction of the Afobaka Dam.

History
The village was founded in the interior of Suriname by runaway slaves. From 1765 onwards, the Moravian Church embarked on missionary activities among the maroons. First the focus was on converting people. In 1850, the first school in the interior was opened in Ganzee. In 1919, the village had a population of about 500 people and was the capital of the Upper Suriname district. In 1931, a clinic was established in the village.

In 1958, plans were developed to create the Afobaka Dam in order to provide electricity for the aluminium industry. The damming of the Suriname River would lead to the Brokopondo Reservoir, and flood the village of Ganzee. With an estimated 1,200 people, Ganzee was the biggest village in the area. In 1964, the villagers were transmigrated to Klaaskreek and Nieuw-Ganzee.

References

Former populated places in Suriname